Leopold Hasner von Artha (15 March 1818, Prague – 5 June 1891, Bad Ischl) was an Austrian civil servant and statesman. He served as the 4th Minister-President of Cisleithania.

References

External links 
 Otto 

1818 births
1891 deaths
Politicians from Prague
People from the Kingdom of Bohemia
German Bohemian people
Bohemian nobility
Austrian untitled nobility
19th-century Ministers-President of Austria
Members of the Austrian House of Deputies (1861–1867)
Members of the Austrian House of Deputies (1867–1870)
Members of the House of Lords (Austria)
Members of the Bohemian Diet
Charles University alumni
Academic staff of Charles University
Burials at the Bad Ischl Friedhof